= Aegeirus =

Town in ancient Lesbos

Coordinates: 39°16′37″N 26°22′19″E

Aegeirus or Aigeiros (Ancient Greek: Αἴγειρος) was a town of ancient Lesbos.

The site of Aegeirus is tentatively located near modern Kabakli.
